East Providence is the name of two places in the United States:

 East Providence Township, Pennsylvania
 East Providence, Rhode Island